Terry Ball may refer to:

Terry B. Ball (born 1955), dean of religious education at Brigham Young University
Terry Ball (ice hockey) (born 1944), Canadian hockey player